The Central District of Iranshahr County is a district (bakhsh) in Iranshahr County, Sistan and Baluchestan province, Iran. At the 2006 census, the district's population (including those portions later split off to form Damen District, was 151,038, in 27,738 families; excluding those portions, the population was 136,817 in 25,112 families.  At the 2016 census, its population had risen to 170,536. The district has one city: Iranshahr. The district has two rural districts (dehestan): Abtar Rural District and Howmeh Rural District.

References 

Iranshahr County
Districts of Sistan and Baluchestan Province
Populated places in Iranshahr County